Saber Rebai (Saber al Ruba'i; born 13 March 1967) is a Tunisian pan-Arab singer, actor, and composer of Yemeni Origin. He is known for his song "Sidi Mansour". Some albums carry the variant transliteration Saber el Rebaii. He has been signed since 2004 to the pan-Arab record label Rotana.

Early life 
Reabï was born in Tunisia to a Yemeni family from Hadramout. In 2006, while performing in Aden, he spoke about his extreme pride of his Yemeni heritage.

Career 
Besides being an accomplished violinist, he started the singing as his profession at 17 years old impressed by singers among which Mohammed Abdel Wahab, Abd El Kader El Asaly, Wadih El Safi, Abdel Halim Hafez, Karem Mahmoud. Saber composed some of his songs melodies among which the song Word (Kalima). He worked with Hilmi Baker, Salah El Charnoubi and Dr. Abd El Rab Idriss.

International concerts 
Saber Rebai went in tours across Europe, USA, Australia and also performed in Palestine and South Korea. He gave shows in the Olympia in Paris, Carthage and Cairo.

Awards 
Saber Al Rubai won many awards for his participation in international festivals among which:
Cartage Festivals for many years
Arab Music Festival
Egyptian Opera House Award
Cairo International Festivals
Francophone Festivals
The Gold Microphone in Cairo Festivals

Discography 
Albums
Hayyarouni – 
Ya lilla – 
Yalli bjamalak – 
2000: Sidi Mansour- 
2001: Khalas tarek – 
2003: Share' elgharam – 
2004: Atahadda al aalam – 
2006: Ajmal nesaa aldounia – 
2007: El ghorba – 
2009: Waheshni giddan – 
Singles
2000: "Sidi Mansour" –

References

External links 

Tunisian people of Yemeni descent
Living people
1967 births
Tunisian male film actors
Tunisian male television actors
Singers who perform in Classical Arabic
Tunisian composers
20th-century Tunisian male singers
20th-century composers
21st-century Tunisian male singers
21st-century composers
People from Sfax
Male composers